Dryotype is a genus of moths of the family Noctuidae.

Species
 Dryotype opina (Grote, 1878)

References
Natural History Museum Lepidoptera genus database
Dryotype at funet

Cuculliinae